Miami Blues is a 1990 American neo-noir black comedy crime drama film directed by George Armitage, based on the novel of the same name by Charles Willeford. It stars Alec Baldwin,  Fred Ward (who also served as an executive producer) and Jennifer Jason Leigh.

Plot 
Frederick J. Frenger Jr. (who asks to be called "Junior"), a violent sociopath and self described thief who "steals from other thieves", is recently released from a California prison, and starts a new life in Miami. Before leaving the airport, he steals luggage and unintentionally kills a Hare Krishna by breaking his index finger. Junior checks into a hotel and hooks up with Susie Waggoner, a naive part time prostitute who is a student at a community college. They become romantically involved and move in to a house together, with Susie blissfully unaware of Junior's criminal activities and harboring fantasies of living happily ever after.

Later, while Susie is taking a bath and writing a haiku, Junior decides to break into a nearby apartment. He steals an IMI Desert Eagle handgun, a coin collection and some pork chops. As he is doing this, he speaks aloud a haiku of his own: "Breaking entering. The dark and lonely places. Finding a big gun".

An investigation of the Hare Krishna murder leads grizzled policeman Sgt. Hoke Moseley to come knocking on their door. Moseley shares a home-cooked dinner with the couple, upon Susie's suggestion, and plays it cool while seemingly indicating to Junior that he's on to him. He overtly suspects Junior has been in prison and wants him to come to the police station for a lineup. In response, Junior goes to Moseley's home the next day, assaults him and steals his gun, badge and dentures. Junior begins using the badge, impersonating a police officer by breaking up robberies, hold ups, and other criminal solicitations only to keep the loot for himself or demanding bribes as rewards after.

While at a convenience store, Junior witnesses an armed robbery and decides to break it up. He lectures the gunman about avoiding a life of crime, but the gunman runs a truck over him. Junior complains to Susie that the "straight life" has made him too soft. Moseley tracks down the couple through a utility account opened up in Susie's name. He pretends to run into her at the grocery store, where they swap recipes. After she lies that she has left Junior, Moseley tells her that Junior is a murderer and that he and the police are looking for him.

Back home, to test whether he will lie to her, Susie deliberately ruins a pie by putting an excessive amount of vinegar in it. To her disappointment, Junior compliments the dessert and eats it with gusto though his face gives it away somewhat. The next day, Junior asks Susie to drive him around town on errands. Their first stop is a pawn shop, which he robs. In the course of the robbery, Junior kills the pawnbroker's bodyguard and seriously injures her, but not before she chops several of his fingers off.

Badly injured, he limps to the car, but Susie drives away upon realizing what he's done. Moseley pursues him to the house, where he shoots and kills Junior in self defense. Being ironic with his last words, Junior tells Moseley, "Susie's gonna get you, Sarge." Susie then arrives and Moseley asks why she stayed with him for so long. She explains that he was kind to her, ate everything she ever cooked and never hit her.

Cast 
 Alec Baldwin as Frederick J. Frenger Jr.
 Fred Ward as Sgt. Hoke Moseley
 Jennifer Jason Leigh as Susie Waggoner
 Charles Napier as Sgt. Bill Henderson
 Nora Dunn as Ellita Sánchez
 Obba Babatundé as Blink Willie
 Shirley Stoler as Edie Wulgemuth
 Paul Gleason as Sgt. Frank Lackley

Production
The film was the first feature directed by George Armitage in over a decade. He later recalled:
Bill Horberg, who was associate producer, brought the book to Fred [Ward], and Fred said: "Oh, this is great." I don't know if Bill had money or not to option the book, but Fred did, and he optioned it. He brought it to Jonathan [Demme] and Gary Goetzman, he wanted Jonathan to direct it. Jonathan had just finished Married to the Mob, which hadn't been released yet, and he had shot in Miami, and he said to Fred: "Why don't you give it to Din [George Armitage]? Give it to George." And he did, and I loved it. He said "Do you want to write the script and direct it?" I said "Absolutely, let's go." I had worked for Mike Medavoy, who was now head of Orion Pictures, on Vigilante Force, and he said: "Sure, good." Fred, Jonathan, and Gary—who would go on to produce a number of wonderful things for Tom Hanks's company, though this was his first film—were amazingly helpful.
Armitage says the script omitted a key plot point in the novel, that the Hare Krishna killed by Fred was Susie's brother. "It took 10 or 15 pages to explain that relationship, and it bothered me—that kind of serendipity. And we were just sitting there talking: "Why do we need to have that anyways?" It really was just a matter of economy. In early drafts it was in. In the novel it works beautifully, because it's Willeford."
At one stage Gene Hackman was going to play Hoke and Fred Ward was to play Junior. Then Hackman dropped out and Alec Baldwin came in to read.

He knocked us out, so I said: "Fred, what do you think?" He said: "He's Junior. I'll be Hoke." And Alec was extraordinary. It rained a lot during the shoot, which would shut us down because you could hear the rain on the roof, it was too loud, so we'd have to wait it out. One day we were sitting around Junior and Susie's house, and Alec gets behind the camera and does about a five-minute impression of Tak Fujimoto. Then he moves over to the electrical department and does spot-on impressions of all of those guys. Everybody was awestruck. He also did an impression of me that was rather insulting, and very funny. What I wanted to do in that was have the audience go on that ride with Junior while he was running around and playing cop, and to really enjoy it—and the audiences I saw it with did—but then slowly I wanted to take it away from them, so that by the end they would feel a little bit guilty about having so much fun earlier on in the picture. However, it kind of backfired—we did a preview in New Jersey, and the audience was horrified when Junior died, they practically rioted when Alec was killed … Alec had a little problem with that—he wanted to be a little broader, I was afraid he was commenting on the character, but I must tell you: he was right. We didn't really agree on set, but then he gave me a call [years later] … and said: "Hey, I'm glad you made me do this and that." I said: "I'm glad you did what you did, too." It was a little broader than I would've asked him to play it, but I really like what he did.

Reception

Box office
The film's release was delayed to try to take advantage of Baldwin's success in The Hunt for Red October, which had been released two months earlier, but failed to do so, with an opening weekend gross of $3 million from 832 screens to place fourth for the weekend, behind The Hunt for Red October. It went on to gross $9.9 million in the United States and Canada.

Critical response
On the review aggregator website Rotten Tomatoes, the film has a rating of 85% based on 26 reviews. The website's consensus reads, "Laced with hard-boiled thrills and pitch-black comedy, Miami Blues delivers a disarmingly off-kilter crime caper." On Metacritic, it has a score of 72 out of 100 based on reviews from 27 critics, indicating "generally favorable reviews". Audiences surveyed by CinemaScore gave the film a grade "C" on a scale of A to F.

Janet Maslin of The New York Times wrote: "Miami Blues is best appreciated for the performances of its stars and for the kinds of funny, scene-stealing peripheral touches that keep it lively even when it's less than fully convincing." 
Roger Ebert of the Chicago Sun-Times gave it 2 out of 4 and wrote: "They're looking for the right tone in Miami Blues, and they don't find it very often, but when they do, you can see what they were looking for."

References

External links 
 
 
 
 

1990 films
1990 comedy films
1990s black comedy films
1990s crime comedy-drama films
1990s heist films
American black comedy films
American crime comedy-drama films
American heist films
American neo-noir films
American police detective films
Films based on American novels
Films directed by George Armitage
Films produced by Gary Goetzman
Films scored by Gary Chang
Films set in Miami
Orion Pictures films
1990s English-language films
1990s American films